The 2017–18 EFL League Two (referred to as the Sky Bet League Two for sponsorship reasons) is the 14th season of the Football League Two under its current title and the 25th season under its current league division format.

Team changes
The following teams changed division after the 2016–17 season.

To League Two 
Promoted from National League
 Lincoln City
 Forest Green Rovers

Relegated from League One
 Port Vale
 Swindon Town
 Coventry City
 Chesterfield

From League Two 
Promoted to League One
 Portsmouth
 Plymouth Argyle
 Doncaster Rovers
 Blackpool

Relegated to National League
 Hartlepool United
 Leyton Orient

Teams

Managerial changes

League table

Play-offs

Results

Top scorers

References

 
EFL League Two seasons
4
England

3